Harry Lundahl (16 October 1905 – 2 March 1988) was a Swedish football player and manager. He is most famous for his time playing for Helsingborgs IF.

References

Bibliography
 

1905 births
1988 deaths
Swedish footballers
Association football midfielders
Sweden international footballers
Swedish football managers
Allsvenskan players
Helsingborgs IF players
IFK Eskilstuna players
Malmö FF managers
1934 FIFA World Cup players
FC Rosengård 1917 managers
Sportspeople from Helsingborg